Simone White (born 1972) is an American poet, literary critic, and assistant professor at the University of Pennsylvania. In 2017, she won a Whiting Award for poetry. Much of her writing style is a hybrid between poetry and prose.

Biography
White was born in Middletown, Connecticut, and grew up in Philadelphia. She has a BA from Wesleyan University and earned a JD from Harvard Law School in 1997. She practiced law for seven years after graduation. Since then, she has also earned an MFA from The New School and a PhD in English from the City University of New York.

She was a visiting associate professor at the University of Iowa Writers' Workshop in Spring 2018.

As of 2020, she is an assistant professor in the English department at the University of Pennsylvania.

Honors and awards
White was award a Whiting Award for Poetry in 2017.

She was selected as a "New American Poet" by the Poetry Society of America in 2013.

Bibliography

Poetry
 Dear Angel of Death, Ugly Duckling Presse, 2018
 Of Being Dispersed, Futurepoem Books, 2016
 House of Envy of All the World, 2010
 Unrest, Ugly Duckling Presse, 2013 (chapbook)
 Dolly (with illustrations by Kim Thomas), Q Ave Press, 2008

Articles
  Vince Staples by Simone White, Bomb Magazine

References

External links
 Website
 Poetry Foundation profile

Living people
University of Pennsylvania faculty
Harvard Law School alumni
The New School alumni
City University of New York alumni
African-American poets
People from Middletown, Connecticut
1972 births
Wesleyan University alumni
21st-century African-American people
20th-century African-American people